Transplant or Transplantation may refer to:

Sciences
Transplanting a plant from one location to another
Organ transplantation, moving an organ from one body to another
Transplant thought experiment, an experiment similar to Trolley problem
Transplant experiment, where an organism is moved from one location to another
Ectopic endometrial implantation as part of the theory of retrograde menstruation in endometriosis
 Transplantation (journal)

Art and entertainment
Transplants (band), an American band
Transplants (album), 2002
Transplant (video game), an Amiga game
Transplant, a novel by Malcolm Rose
"Transplant" (House), a television episode
Transplant (TV series), a Canadian television series premiering in February 2020

See also

 Graft (disambiguation), including some senses meaning a type of transplant